Skripeyevka is a rural locality in Bolshezhirovsky Selsoviet Rural Settlement, Fatezhsky District, Kursk Oblast, Russia. Population:

Geography 
The village is located 101 km from the Russia–Ukraine border, 30 km north-west of Kursk, 15 km south-east of the district center – the town Fatezh, 1 km from the selsoviet center – Bolshoye Zhirovo.

 Climate
Skripeyevka has a warm-summer humid continental climate (Dfb in the Köppen climate classification).

Transport 
Skripeyevka is located 1.5 km from the federal route  Crimea Highway as part of the European route E105, 22 km from the road of regional importance  (Kursk – Ponyri), 5.5 km from the road  (Fatezh – 38K-018), on the road of intermunicipal significance  (Bolshoye Zhirovo – Skripeyevka – Kutasovka), 24 km from the nearest railway halt 521 km (railway line Oryol – Kursk).

The rural locality is situated 32 km from Kursk Vostochny Airport, 152 km from Belgorod International Airport and 224 km from Voronezh Peter the Great Airport.

References

Notes

Sources

Rural localities in Fatezhsky District